This is a list of the 24 members of the European Parliament for Belgium in the 2004 to 2009 session.

List

Party representation

Notes

Belgium
2004
List